Anne Terry White (February 19, 1896 – July 1980) was a Russian Empire-born American writer and translator.

The daughter of Aaron and Sarah Terry, she was born Anne Terry in the Russian Empire, and came to the United States with her family at the age of 8. She was educated at Brown University and obtained a master's degree from Stanford University in 1925. She worked as a teacher and social worker. Besides writing books for young people, she also translated works for children from Russian to English.

In 1918, she married Harry Dexter White; the couple had two daughters.

In 1937, she published Heroes of the Five Books about characters from the Old Testament, her first book. Her books were primarily non-fiction on a variety of subjects, including archaeology, anthropology, other various scientific topics and biographies. She also published adaptions of myths, fairy tales and classic children's literature.

Selected works 
 Three Children and Shakespeare (1938)
 Men Before Adam (1942)
 George Washington Carver: The Story of a Great American (1953)
 All About the Stars (1954)
 All About Great Rivers of the World (1957)
 Rocks All Around Us (1959)
 Birds of the World (1962)
 The American Indian (1963
 With Dersu the Hunter: Adventures in the Taiga (1965) adapted from a work by Vladimir Arsenyev
 Man, the Thinker (1967) with G. S. Lietz
 North to Liberty: The Story of the Underground Railroad (1972)
 Prehistoric America, Landmark Books Series published by Random House (1951)

References 

1896 births
1980 deaths
Emigrants from the Russian Empire to the United States
Ukrainian women writers
American women children's writers
American children's writers
20th-century American women
20th-century American people